Muscotah is a city in Atchison County, Kansas, United States.  As of the 2020 census, the population of the city was 155.  Muscotah was named for the Kickapoo Native American word for "prairie"

History
Muscotah was platted in 1857. The original location of the town was about two and a half miles northeast of the current location of the town. Soon after the town was founded in its original location, it was determined that the Central Branch Union Pacific Railroad line would pass just to the south, so a new town was built on the railroad line near the Delaware River. A grist mill was built on the river to take advantage of the water power.

Geography
Muscotah is located at  (39.553325, -95.520731).

Demographics

2010 census
As of the census of 2010, there were 176 people, 69 households, and 46 families residing in the city. The racial makeup of the city was 99.4% White and 0.6% from two or more races. Hispanic or Latino of any race were 3.4% of the population.

There were 69 households, of which 31.9% had children under the age of 18 living with them, 44.9% were married couples living together, 13.0% had a female householder with no husband present, 8.7% had a male householder with no wife present, and 33.3% were non-families. 27.5% of all households were made up of individuals, and 11.6% had someone living alone who was 65 years of age or older. The average household size was 2.55 and the average family size was 3.11.

The median age in the city was 36.3 years. 26.7% of residents were under the age of 18; 5.7% were between the ages of 18 and 24; 28.4% were from 25 to 44; 23.3% were from 45 to 64; and 15.9% were 65 years of age or older. The gender makeup of the city was 52.3% male and 47.7% female.

2000 census
As of the census of 2000, there were 200 people, 81 households, and 58 families residing in the city. The racial makeup of the city was 96.00% White, 2.00% Native American, and 2.00% from two or more races. Hispanic or Latino of any race were 1.00% of the population.

There were 81 households, out of which 29.6% had children under the age of 18 living with them, 59.3% were married couples living together, 3.7% had a female householder with no husband present, and 27.2% were non-families. 22.2% of all households were made up of individuals, and 13.6% had someone living alone who was 65 years of age or older. The average household size was 2.47 and the average family size was 2.88.

In the city, the population was spread out, with 25.0% under the age of 18, 8.0% from 18 to 24, 26.5% from 25 to 44, 20.0% from 45 to 64, and 20.5% who were 65 years of age or older. The median age was 36 years. For every 100 females, there were 92.3 males. For every 100 females age 18 and over, there were 100.0 males.

The median income for a household in the city was $30,833, and the median income for a family was $31,875. Males had a median income of $23,750 versus $25,625 for females. The per capita income for the city was $15,299. About 7.3% of families and 14.4% of the population were below the poverty line, including 15.7% of those under the age of eighteen and 18.9% of those 65 or over.

Government
The Muscotah government consists of a mayor and five council members.  The council meets the 2nd Monday of each month at 7PM.
 City Hall, 604 Kansas Ave.

Education
Muscotah Schools operated for over 130 years.  The final class of Muscotah High School graduated in 1939.  It was reduced to 8th grade, then later to 6th grade.  The Muscotah Grade School closed in 1990.  The school mascot was the Mustangs and the colors were red and white.  Muscotah students currently attend USD 377.

Notable people
 Joe Tinker, Major League Baseball player for Chicago Cubs and Cincinnati Reds. Playing shortstop for the Cubs, Tinker was part of the famous trio - "Tinker-to-Evers-to-Chance." Tinker was elected to the National Baseball Hall of Fame in 1946.  There is a monument in the Muscotah city park honoring Tinker.

See also
 Central Branch Union Pacific Railroad

References

Further reading

External links
 Muscotah - Directory of Public Officials
 USD 377, local school district
 Muscotah city map, KDOT

Cities in Kansas
Cities in Atchison County, Kansas
1857 establishments in Kansas Territory